Jannowitz Bridge (German: Jannowitzbrücke) is a bridge over the Spree River in Berlin. The bridge connects Heinrich Heine Straße and Brückenstraße in Mitte with Alexanderplatz.

History
The bridge was built by cotton manufacturer Christian August Jannowitz. Construction of the bridge began in 1822. The bridge was originally a wooden structure and was replaced in 1881 by an iron truss bridge.

Jannowitz Bridge was dismantled in 1927 to allow construction of the U8 subway line. It was replaced with a new iron girder bridge that opened in 1932, along with the Jannowitzbrücke U-Bahn station. The bridge was destroyed by the Germans, as a "defensive measure", during the Battle of Berlin in World War II. The bridge was rebuilt again in the early 1950s.

References

External links
 

Bridges in Berlin
Buildings and structures in Mitte
Road bridges in Germany